William Huck (born 17 March 1979) is a French professional footballer, the son of former French international player Jean-Noël Huck. He currently plays for amateur club Vendée Poiré sur Vie.

Career
Moving from French side AS Monaco, Huck began his career as an apprentice at Arsenal, but he never made a league appearance for the Gunners. Huck signed for Bournemouth in 1999, and made 40 league appearances in three seasons. Huck scored twice during his spell at Bournemouth; once in a League Cup tie against Barnet and once in a Football League Trophy tie against Dover Athletic. He later returned to France with Angers SCO, where he played 52 matches. He then played for Montluçon, Toulon and now plays for Vendée Poiré sur Vie.

References

External links

1979 births
Living people
French footballers
Arsenal F.C. players
AFC Bournemouth players
English Football League players
Angers SCO players
Ligue 2 players
SC Toulon players
Vendée Poiré-sur-Vie Football players
Montluçon Football players
Association football midfielders